Jennifer Cooke (born September 19, 1964) is a former American actress. She is best known for her roles as Elizabeth Maxwell on the NBC science fiction television series V (1984–85) and as Megan Garris in the slasher film Friday the 13th Part VI: Jason Lives (1986).

Career
She is perhaps best known for her role as the "Star Child", Elizabeth, who is half Human/half Visitor in the 1984 television series V. She also starred in the soap opera Guiding Light as Morgan Richards Nelson from 1981 to 1983. Cooke played "Debbie" on the NBC miniseries A Year in the Life. Her only well-known film role is in the 1986 horror film Friday the 13th Part VI: Jason Lives as Megan. Cooke's only guest appearance on TV is on the HBO series The Hitchhiker.

After appearing in Friday the 13th Part VI, Cooke retired from acting. She has been married to Celestial Seasonings co-founder Mo Siegel since 1989 and gave birth to 2 children. She briefly returned to the public eye in 2013 when she was interviewed for Crystal Lake Memories, a retrospective documentary about the Friday the 13th film series, in which she recalled her role in Part VI.

Filmography

References

External links

1964 births
American film actresses
American soap opera actresses
American television actresses
Living people
Actresses from New York City
21st-century American women